Maria Teresa Bonifacio Cenzon is a Judge of the Superior Court of Guam.

Education 

Cenzon received her Bachelor of Arts from Marquette University and her Juris Doctor from the Loyola University Chicago School of Law.

Legal career 

Cenzon began her career as a law clerk at Barcinas & Terlaje. She later joined the law firm of Mair, Mair, Spade & Thompson, and  became a partner. In 2008, she joined Cabot Mantanona as a partner and in 2009 she became of counsel for Carlsmith Ball. She previously served as Chief Legal Counsel to the Governor of Guam. In April 2010 she was named Director of Policy, Planning & Community Relations for the Unified Judiciary of Guam.

Judicial career

Superior Court of Guam 

On September 11, 2012, Governor Eddie Baza Calvo appointed Cenzon to be a Judge of the Superior Court of Guam. She received a unanimous vote in the 31st Guam Legislature and was sworn in on December 20, 2012.

Nomination to district court 

On November 13, 2020, President Trump announced his intent to nominate Cenzon to serve as a Judge for the District Court of Guam. On November 30, 2020, her nomination was sent to the Senate. President Trump nominated Cenzon to the seat being vacated by Judge Frances Tydingco-Gatewood, whose term expired on August 4, 2016. On January 3, 2021, her nomination was returned to the President under Rule XXXI, Paragraph 6 of the United States Senate. Later that same day, her renomination was sent to the Senate. President Joe Biden withdrew her nomination on February 4, 2021.

References 

Year of birth missing (living people)
Living people
20th-century American lawyers
21st-century American judges
20th-century American women lawyers
Guamanian judges
Guamanian lawyers
Guamanian people
Loyola University Chicago School of Law alumni
Marquette University alumni
21st-century American women judges